Ruakākā Bay is a bay in Tōtaranui / Queen Charlotte Sound, Aotearoa New Zealand, sitting between Tahuahua Bay / Blackwood Bay and Miritū Bay / Bay of Many Coves.

Naming
Ruakākā is a combination of the Te Reo Māori words rua, meaning "hole", and kākā, the native parrot Nestor meridionalis. Together the name means "kākā hole/s", referencing the kākā nests built in holes in the trees there. Ruakākā Bay was dubbed "Fly Bay" on John Lort Stokes' map.

Cherry Bay
Cherry Bay is located on Ruakākā Bay'''s eastern coast, between Rātimera Bay and Moriori Bay. The bays name is likely a reference to cherry trees being planted there, much like Cherry Tree Bay on Rangitoto ki te Tonga / D'Urville Island.

Moriori BayMoriori Bay  is located on the western coast of Ruakākā Bay, between Cherry Bay and Wairākau Bay. The bay is likely named for the Moriori, the native people of Rēkohu. Pit dwellings, similar to those used by the Moriori, have been found in various places throughout the Marlborough Sounds. Linguistic studies have shown the Moriori ancestors likely immigrated from Aotearoa New Zealand around 1500CE, as the Moriori language shares many characteristics with the Ngāi Tahu dialect of Te Reo Māori.

Ngatakore PointNgatakore Point is located on the eastern tip of Ruakākā Bay.Ngatakore can be split into 2 Te Reo Māori words, ngata meaning "snail" or "slug", and kore meaning "broken" or "no longer". Together ngatakore can be taken to mean "broken snail shell" or "no longer snails/slugs".

Pīrapu Bay & Pīrapu PointPīrapu Bay is the only officially named bay on the eastern coast of Ruakākā Bay. Pīrapu Point sits at its northern tip.Pīrapu can be split into 2 Te Reo Māori words, pī meaning "the young of birds", and rapu meaning "to search/hunt for". Together pīrapu means "to search/hunt for young birds".

Rātimera Bay & Rātimera PointRātimera Bay is the northern most bay on the western coast of Ruakākā Bay. Rātimera Point marks its northern tip.Rātimera can be split into 2 Te Reo Māori words, rā meaning "over there" or "yonder", and timera meaning "chimney" or "funnel". Together Rātimera could mean "place to spot ship chimneys", or simply "chimney". Historian William Henry Sherwood Roberts posits it means "the yonder headland cliff".

Pīrata / West HeadPīrata / West Head is located on the eastern tip of Ruakākā Bay. Pīrata is a Te Reo Māori word meaning "to be sharp" or "to be conspicuous". West Head is a reference to the points location opposite Kura Te Au / Tory Channel. Its counterpart, East Head, is now known as Bull Head. Other points known as West Head in Aotearoa can be found here.

Luke RockLuke Rock sits in the entrance to Ruakākā Bay. The rock is marked by a white beacon with a flashing green light. The water around Luke Rock is relatively deep, with the North-East side containing weeds & a depth of only 2 metres.

Wairākau BayWairākau can be split into 2 Te Reo Māori words, wai meaning "water", and rākau meaning "tree" or "stick". Together wairākau'' means "trees in the water" or "waterlogged sticks".

References

Bays of the Marlborough Region
Marlborough Sounds